Saint-Romain-et-Saint-Clément (Limousin: Sent Róman e Sent Clamenç) is a commune in the Dordogne department in Nouvelle-Aquitaine in southwestern France.

In 1827, the municipalities of St. Clement and St. Romain merge under the name of Saint-Romain-et-Saint-Clement.

Geography
The Côle forms the commune's northeastern border, then flows west-southwest through the middle of the commune.

Population

See also
Communes of the Dordogne department

References

Communes of Dordogne